This article is about an English horse race.  For the American horse race with the same name, see Cardinal Stakes (USA).

|}

The Cardinal Stakes is a flat horse race in Great Britain open to three-year-old horses. It is run at Chelmsford City over a distance of 1 mile.

The race was run for the first time in 2019 as the last of seven races in the European Road to the Kentucky Derby series, through which horses earn points and the chance to qualify for the Kentucky Derby.

Winners

See also
 Horse racing in Great Britain
 List of British flat horse races
 Road to the Kentucky Derby Conditions Stakes

References

Racing Post:

Flat races in Great Britain
Chelmsford City Racecourse
Flat horse races for three-year-olds
Recurring sporting events established in 2019
2019 establishments in England